William of Auvergne may refer to:
 William of Auvergne, Bishop of Paris (1228–1249)
 William IV of Auvergne (989–1016) (also called William I or V)
 William V of Auvergne (1032–1064) (also called William II or VI)
 William VI of Auvergne (1096–1136) (also called William III or VII)
 William VII the Young of Auvergne (1143 – c. 1155) (also called William IV or VIII) (remained Count-Dauphin of Auvergne)
 William VIII the Old, count of Auvergne (1155–1182) (also called William VII or IX; overthrew his nephew in 1155 and took over most of the county)
 William IX of Auvergne (1194–1195) (not always listed as a count, sometimes William X or XI)
 William X of Auvergne (1224–1246) (sometimes William XI or XII)
 William XI of Auvergne (1277–1279) (sometimes William XII or XIII)
 William XII of Auvergne (1325–1332) (sometimes William XIII or XIV)

See also 
 Rulers of Auvergne